Solomon Taylor North (May 24, 1853 – October 19, 1917) was a Republican member of the U.S. House of Representatives from Pennsylvania.

Solomon T. North, usually referred to as S. Taylor North or S. T. North, was born in Jefferson County, Pennsylvania.  He taught school for six years and served as a school director for twenty years.  He also worked as a lumber merchant, farmer, and banker.  He was a member of the Pennsylvania National Guard.  He was a delegate to the Republican State Convention in 1898.  He served as director of the Punxsutawney National Bank and a member of the board of education.  He was a member of the Pennsylvania State House of Representatives from 1905 to 1907, 1911, and 1913.

North was elected as a Republican to the Sixty-fourth Congress.  He was an unsuccessful candidate for renomination in 1916.  He died near Punxsutawney, Pennsylvania.  Interment in Circle Hill Cemetery.

Sources

The Political Graveyard

1853 births
1917 deaths
Republican Party members of the Pennsylvania House of Representatives
Republican Party members of the United States House of Representatives from Pennsylvania
School board members in Pennsylvania
19th-century American politicians